Michael Leon Hooten (born April 4, 1948) is a former American Major League Baseball pitcher. He played for the Oakland Athletics during the  season.

References
, or Retrosheet, or Venezuelan Winter League

1948 births
Living people
Arizona Wildcats baseball players
Baseball players from California
Birmingham A's players
Coos Bay-North Bend A's players
Iowa Oaks players
Major League Baseball pitchers
Oakland Athletics players
Sportspeople from Downey, California
Tigres de Aragua players
American expatriate baseball players in Venezuela
Tucson Toros players
University of Arizona alumni